Przyjezierze  is a village in the administrative district of Gmina Jeziora Wielkie(part of this village is administrated by Gmina Strzelno), within Mogilno County, Kuyavian-Pomeranian Voivodeship , in north-central Poland.

The village has a population of 200.

References

Przyjezierze